This list of civil engineers is a list of notable people who have been trained in or have practiced civil engineering.

A

B

C

D

E

F

G

H

I

J

K

L

M

N

O

P

Q

R

S

T

U

V

W

X

Y

Z

References

 
Civil engineers

de:Liste bekannter Ingenieure